Barbara Tetenbaum (born 1957), is an American contemporary artist who produces limited edition artist books.

Early life and education
Born in 1957, Tetenbaum is the daughter of Marvin and Zelda (Dorin) Tetenbaum).  She earned her MFA in printmaking at the School of the Art Institute of Chicago and a BFA from the University of Wisconsin-Madison.

Career
Tetenbaum was on the faculty and served as Department Head of Book Arts at the Oregon College of Arts and Craft in Portland, Oregon. She operates Triangular Press.

Tetenbaum's work is held in a number of artists' books collections in institutions, including the Smithsonian, Harvard University Fine Arts Library, the University of Oregon, and University of Michigan.

Critical reception 
Marcia Reed, who chairs the Exhibition Awards committee of the Association of College and Research Libraries Rare Books and Manuscripts Section, said:

Karla Starr wrote in Willamette Week, "Her masterful, varied interpretations of the book have been featured in exhibitions worldwide... Her unusual, enchanting graphic juxtapositions range from surreal to nostalgic, demonstrating command and interest in exploiting all elements involved in book design."

Selected publications 

 Tetenbaum, Barbara. Emptiness is not Nothing. Die Leere ist Nicht Nichts. Leipzig: Triangular Press. 2009.
 Tetenbaum, Barbara and Julie Chen. Glimpse. Portland and Berkeley: Triangular Press and Flying Fish Press. 2011.
 Tetenbaum, Barbara. Mining My Ántonia. Portland and West Hartford: Triangular Press and the Hartford Art School Print Workshop. 2012.
 Tetenbaum, Barbara. A Powerfully Exciting Short Story. Portland: Triangular Press.  2008.
 Satie, Erik. Ode to a Grand Staircase (For Four Hands).'' Julie Chen, Barbara Tetenbaum, artists. Berkeley, CA: Flying Fish Press; Portland, OR: Triangular Press, 2001.

Awards 
 2003-04 Fulbright Lecture award to teach in the Czech Republic.
 2005 Oregon Arts Fellowship.
 2005 Regional Arts and Culture Council Project Grant.
 2010 or 2011 Sally Bishop Fellowship at the Center for Book Arts in New York.

References

External links
 
 Slow read Portfolio
  Slow Down and Enjoy Art: An Interview with Barb Tetenbaum

Triangular Press ~ Oregon (Barbara Tetenbaum)

1957 births
20th-century American women artists
21st-century American women artists
Oregon College of Art and Craft people
Living people